Lynique Beneke (née Prinsloo; born 30 March 1991) is a South African athlete specialising in the long jump. She represented her country at the 2013 World Championships.

Her personal best in the event is 6.81 metres (-1.2 m/s) set in Stellenbosch in 2013.

She is married to a South African hurdler, PC Beneke.

International competitions

References

1991 births
Living people
Place of birth missing (living people)
South African female long jumpers
Athletes (track and field) at the 2015 African Games
Athletes (track and field) at the 2019 African Games
World Athletics Championships athletes for South Africa
University of Johannesburg alumni
Athletes (track and field) at the 2016 Summer Olympics
Olympic athletes of South Africa
South African Athletics Championships winners
Competitors at the 2017 Summer Universiade
African Games competitors for South Africa
African Games medalists in athletics (track and field)
African Games bronze medalists for South Africa